Elmira may refer to:

Places

Canada
 Elmira, Ontario
 Elmira, Prince Edward Island

United States
 Elmira, California
 Elmira, Idaho
 Elmira, Indiana
 Elmira, Michigan
 Elmira, Missouri
 Elmira, New York
 Elmira Correctional Facility
 Elmira College
 Elmira Corning Regional Airport
 Elmira Pioneers, a baseball team
 Elmira (town), New York
 Elmira, Oregon
 Elmira Prison, American Civil War POW camp

Persons
 Elmira (name), a given name
 Elvira

See also 
 Elmira (gastropod), genus of gastropods 
 Elmira Township (disambiguation)
 Almira (disambiguation)